Amir H. Hoveyda is an American organic chemist and professor of chemistry at Boston College, and held the position of department chair until 2018. In 2019, he embarked as researcher at the Institute of Science and Supramolecular Engineering at University of Strasbourg.

Hoveyda received his Ph.D. from Yale University (advisor: Stuart Schreiber) in 1986, and worked as postdoctoral fellow in David A. Evans lab at Harvard University. He received the Cope Scholar award from the American Chemical Society in 1998.

Hoveyda's research focuses on the development for chemoselective and stereoselective catalysis, in particular function-oriented catalyst design. He is particularly noted for his work on developing catalysts for stereoselective olefin metathesis, such as the Hoveyda–Grubbs catalyst. In recent years he has worked extensively on copper(I)-N-heterocyclic carbenes complex catalyzed allyl addition, allylic substitution and conjugate addition reactions. His research also involves metal-free catalysis, e.g. catalytic stereoselective allyl addition reactions promoted by chiral aminophenol-derived ligands, as well as bioactive molecules synthesis.

References

External links
 http://www.ximo-inc.com Co-founder, Board member, Science Co-lead

21st-century American chemists
Yale University alumni
Harvard University staff
Boston College faculty
Living people
Year of birth missing (living people)